Celeste Coltellini (26 November 1760 - 24 July 1828) was an Italian soprano. She was a well-known singer of opera buffa in Europe in the late 18th century.

Born in Livorno, Celeste was the daughter of a librettist, Marco Coltellini. In 1780, she made her debut at Teatro alla Scala in Milan, performing in three operas: Giovanni Valentini's Le nozze in contrasto, Giacomo Rust's Gli antiquari in Palmira and  Giovanni Paisiello's La Frascatana,  singing in mezzo-soprano register.  She then sang at Teatro San Carlo in Naples, where she had the opportunity to meet Emperor Joseph II, who later invited her to perform in Vienna.

When her voice changed to soprano, she accepted the Emperor's invitation. In 1785, she went to Vienna with her mother, and stayed there for a year. In Vienna, she made her debut singing Domenico Cimarosa’s Contadina di spirito. She returned to Vienna again in 1788, but stayed just for a few months. She was seen with Mozart several times at music performances and parties, however, there was no record or any official report mentioning about any affairs or collaboration works between them.

Coltellini was famous for her excellent interpretation of the title role in Nina, o sia La pazza per amore by Giovanni Paisiello. Her sister Annetta, also a singer, often accompanied her in the production.

In 1792, at the age of 32, Celeste retired from the opera stage and married the Swiss banker Jean-Georges Meuricoffre who owned a bank in Naples.

Coltellini died in Naples in 1828.

References

Further reading 
Dizionario di Musica - di A. Della Corte e G.M. Gatti - Paravia Edizioni (Italian language)
Elio Capriati, Ritratto di famiglia: i Meuricoffre, Millennium Ed. 2003 Bologna  (Italian language)
Carola Bebermeier: Celeste Coltellini (1760-1828) - Lebensbilder einer Sängerin und Malerin, Böhlau-Verlag, Köln/Wien/Weimar 2015.
Carola Bebermeier: Materialitäten, Orte und Erinnerungen. Am Beispiel der Sängerin Celeste Coltellini in: Nieper, Lena und Schmitz, Julian (Hrsg.): Musik als Medium der Erinnerung. Gedächtnis - Geschichte- Gegenwart. transcript-Verlag, Bielefeld 2016,

External links 

1760 births
1829 deaths
Italian operatic sopranos
People from Livorno
18th-century Italian women opera singers